Tingena griseata is a species of moth in the family Oecophoridae. It is endemic to New Zealand and has been observed in North Canterbury. The larvae of this species are leaf litter feeders.

Taxonomy 
This species was first described by Arthur Gardiner Butler in 1877 using specimens collected by J.D. Enys and James Hector, and named Oecophora griseata. George Hudson discussed this species under the name Borkhausenia griseata in his 1928 publication The butterflies and moths of New Zealand. In 1988 J. S. Dugdale placed this species within the genus Tingena. The male lectotype specimen, collected either in Christchurch or Dunedin, is held at the Natural History Museum, London.

Description
Butler described this species as follows:

Distribution
This species of moth is endemic to New Zealand and has been observed in North Canterbury including on Rakaia Island.

Hosts 
The larvae of this species feed on leaf litter.

References

Oecophoridae
Moths of New Zealand
Moths described in 1877
Endemic fauna of New Zealand
Taxa named by Arthur Gardiner Butler
Endemic moths of New Zealand